The Pai khel tribe is a sub branch of Niazi Pashtun Tribe. The people of that tribe lived in Paikhel town. 

Haji Ikramullah Khan Late (Ex-Provincial ministers of Punjab) belonged to the Pai Khel tribe.

References

Pashtun tribes
Social groups of Punjab, Pakistan